Vasileios Christopoulos (Greek: Βασίλειος Χριστόπουλος, b. 1951 in Patras, Greece) is a Greek writer.

He studied in Athens at the National Technical University of Athens and at the University of Glasgow as a civil engineer. He currently lives and works in Patras since 1976.

He wrote novels, members for the traditional architecture and essays of his works.

Literature

References
The first version of the article is translated and is based from the article at the Greek Wikipedia (el:Main Page)

1951 births
National Technical University of Athens alumni
Writers from Patras
Living people